The Yauyos Province is a province located in the Lima Region of Peru. It is one of the eleven that make up that region.

Boundaries
North: Huarochirí Province
East: Junín Region, Huancavelica Region
South: Ica Region
West: Cañete Province

Geography 
The Nor Yauyos-Cochas Landscape Reserve lies in the Yauyos Province. Aqupallqa, Llunk'uti, Qutuni, Runchu, T'uru and Wankarqucha of the Cordillera Central of Peru belong to the highest mountains of the province. They all reach altitudes above . Other mountains of the province include:

Some of the largest lakes of the province are listed below:

History
During the 2007 Peru earthquake, Yauyos suffered major damage.

Political division
The capital of this province is the city of Yauyos.

Demographics
The province has a population of 28,000 inhabitants as of 2002. One distinctive cultural trait of the province is that the Tupe district is home to the small ethnic minority who speak the indigenous Jaqaru/Kawki language, a linguistic curiosity as the only surviving relative of Aymara, spoken far to the south in the Altiplano. Besides that, several archaic Quechua dialects are spoken in some districts (Huacarpana, Apurí, Madean, Viñac, Azángaro, Huangáscar, Chocos, Cacra, Hongos, Tanta, Lincha, Tomás, Alis, Huancaya, Vitis, and Laraos). However, all these dialects and languages, respectively, are in danger of extinction.

See also
 Jaqaru language
 Khuchi Mach'ay
 Pirqa Pirqa
 Qaqa Mach'ay
 Sima Pumaqucha
 Wamanmarka

References

External links

  Official provincial web site

Provinces of the Lima Region